Araschnia dohertyi is a butterfly of the family Nymphalidae found in parts of Asia, including northern Burma and China (Yunnan).

References

Araschnia
Butterflies described in 1899